Kudzu Kings is an alternative country/roots rock jam band from Oxford, Mississippi. Their sound has been categorized as a blend of country music, bluegrass and improvisational rock & roll.  The band was actively together and toured aggressively for almost ten years (1994–2003). Today, Kudzu Kings play regularly in the Southeast for festivals, benefits, obscure astrological events, or big paychecks to tamper with their unique chemistry.  In addition, members are working on various projects, both solo and with other Kudzu members; some current projects the Kings have sired are Pithecanfunkus Erectus, Tate Moore and the Cosmic Door, Effie Burt Band, Hemptones, Sparkle Pants, Blackbird Hour, and Rocket 88.

In their touring years together, the band garnered substantial success in the Southeast, Colorado, and Texas, in addition to spreading their base to the rest of the nation and Canada with a number of tours. They have shared the stage many times with Widespread Panic (with whom longtime Kudzu guitarist George McConnell eventually joined up with in 2002), as well as with many other artists, including Bob Weir and Rob Wasserman, Leftover Salmon, Jimmie Dale Gilmore and Junior Brown, just to name a few. Kudzu Kings have also welcomed a number of guest musicians to collaborate over the years (sometimes sitting in for several shows for absent members) including Chris Ethridge, Bucky Baxter, John "Jojo" Hermann (of Widespread Panic), Cody Dickinson (of North Mississippi All-Stars), and Tony Furtado.

Band members
Members include (but not limited to):

Current Members
 Tate Moore – acoustic guitars, vocals
 Dave Woolworth – bass, baroque doghouse, vocals
 Robert Chaffe – keyboards
 George McConnell (1995–2001; 2014 –) – acoustic and electric guitars, vocals
 Max Williams (1994–1997; 2004 –) – electric and acoustic guitars, vocals
 Chuck Sigler (1994-2000;2018 -) funk and western drums, vocals

Former Members
 Tommy Bryan Ledford (1997–2003) – banjo, mandolin, vocals
 Daniel Karlish (2001–2003) – electric & slide guitar, vocals
Ted Gainey (1999-2000, numerous occasions and extended stays including 2014 -) – drums
 Chris "Wolfy" Louviere (1999-2000) – drums
 Jefferson E. Colburn (2000–2003) – drums
 CD Overton (2003-2014) – drums

Sometimes with:
 JJ Callaway – trombone
 Cary Hudson (Blue Mountain) – guitar

Discography

Kudzu Kings (1997)
 Produced by Jim Gaines and engineered by Jeffrey Reed
 All Music Guide review []

Y2Kow (1999)
 Produced and engineered by Jeffrey Reed
 CMJ (5/8/00, p. 32) – "...A winning blend of roots rock, traditional country and Delta blues..."

References

American alternative country groups
Jam bands
Musical groups established in 1994
1994 establishments in Mississippi